Anchorage Depot, also known as Alaska Railroad Depot, is the railroad station at the center of the Alaska Railroad system at the junction of the two main lines their trains run on.  It serves as the starting point for many tourists traveling on the luxury trains such as the Denali Star. The station is a Moderne-style three story concrete building, built in 1942 and enlarged in 1948.

It is located at the base of a hill, below downtown Anchorage.

In 1999, it was deemed significant in the history of transportation in Alaska and nominated for listing on the National Register of Historic Places.  The depot, built of concrete and steel and well-equipped, was held to represent the railroad's transition from wooden structures and equipment inadequate for challenges of the World War II era and since.

It was placed on the National Register of Historic Places on August 27, 1999.

It appears that sometime before October 2020, a high platform was built on the third track over from the main depot, thus making this the first train station in Alaska to have a high platform.

See also
National Register of Historic Places listings in Anchorage, Alaska

References

External links

 
 

1942 establishments in Alaska
Alaska Railroad stations
Alaska Railroad station
Historic American Buildings Survey in Alaska
Streamline Moderne architecture in the United States
Railway stations on the National Register of Historic Places in Alaska
Railway stations in the United States opened in 1942
Buildings and structures on the National Register of Historic Places in Anchorage, Alaska